Brixhild Brahimaj (born 5 December 1995) is an Albanian footballer who plays for German club BV Essen as a midfielder.

References

External links

Brixhild Brahimaj at Fupa

1995 births
Living people
Sportspeople from Fier
Association football midfielders
Albanian footballers
Albanian expatriate footballers
Luftëtari Gjirokastër players
Besa Kavajë players
KF Elbasani players
Kategoria Superiore players
Kategoria e Parë players
Albanian expatriate sportspeople in Germany
Expatriate footballers in Germany